ShowShifter, now obsolete, was a proprietary, commercial digital video recorder (DVR) and home theater PC (HTPC) software for Windows.

ShowShifter offered features such as TV recording, PVR facilities, EPG, audio and video Jukebox, and a picture viewer from within a user interface designed to be used by a remote control at a comfortable viewing distance from the video display, hence the term 10-foot user interface.

History
ShowShifter is widely regarded as the original home theater PC software application but is no longer commercially available. It is notable in that it was the first publicly downloadable software to attempt to do this and as such defined this market for years to come. It is often acknowledged as the inspiration for Microsoft's Windows XP Media Center Edition.

ShowShifter first appeared on the market in June 2000 and was the first Media Center application available for download by end users. It was created by Edinburgh-based developer Home Media Networks Ltd.

ShowShifter initially supported analogue cards compressing to AVI and WMV formats in software but version 3 (now called ShowShifter DVB) added support for DVB and Hauppauge WinTV-PVR cards.

In May 2005 Home Media Networks Limited was acquired by SkyNet Global an Australian home networking venture for an undisclosed sum. Shortly afterwards SkyNet ran into financial difficulties, changed corporate direction and took the decision to wind up Home Media Networks as it was no longer fitted into their core strategy.

Future
Following liquidation ShowShifter source IP rights were acquired by a number of groups.

Codevio, a venture consisting of the original ShowShifter founders, acquired both ShowShifter source IP plus the brand name and website. They are now providing custom software development services for DirectShow, VLC and GStreamer as well as licensing out components from the ShowShifter IP portfolio.

A group of former ShowShifter users also entered a successful bid for the ShowShifter source IP. They plan a new product developed from the source that will go under the name MediaPhoenix. This project seems to have stalled however.

See also
 Comparison of PVR software packages

References

Further reading
 Time (magazine)
 http://www.pcw.co.uk/personal-computer-world/software/2043622/showshifter-dvb
 http://www.practicalpc.co.uk/reviews/soft/leisure/showshifter.htm
 http://labs.pcw.co.uk/2005/08/showshifter_upd.html
 http://www.computeractive.co.uk/whatpc/software/2132667/showshifter

External links
 http://www.btandtservices.com
 http://www.mediaphoenix.co.uk

Video recording software